The Dissidents is a 2017 Estonian comedy-action film directed by Jaak Kilmi. The film is about three young men escaping from Soviet Estonia to Sweden via Finland in the 1980s.

Cast 
 Märt Pius - Ralf
 Karl-Andreas Kalmet - Mario / Speculator
 Veiko Porkanen - Einar / Meathead
 Esko Salminen - Lars-Jukka Lampinen
 Julia Berngardt – Rita
 Henrik Kalmet - Mario's brother
 Tõnu Kark - Grandfather
 Ott Sepp	- Hillbilly
 Kristjan Lüüs - Hillbilly

References

External links 

2017 action comedy films
Estonian comedy films
2017 comedy films